The intercavernous sinuses are two in number, an anterior  and a posterior,  and connect the two cavernous sinuses across the middle line. 

The anterior passes in front of the hypophysis cerebri (pituitary gland), the posterior behind it, and they form with the cavernous sinuses a venous circle (circular sinus) around the hypophysis.

The anterior one is usually the larger of the two, and one or other is occasionally absent.

References

See also
 Dural venous sinuses

Veins of the head and neck